THQ Studio Australia was one of the subsidiaries of electronic game publisher THQ. Based in Brisbane, Australia, the studio have developed titles for the Sixth and Seventh generation of games consoles and managed (via internal producers) the development of handheld versions of their games utilizing smaller local and interstate development studios.

History
THQ Studio Australia was founded in 2003 and concentrated on developing titles based on popular Nickelodeon TV licenses. Releasing a new title yearly between 2004 and 2008 before expanding into multiple teams and developing movie tie-in games such as The Last Airbender based on M. Night Shyamalan's 2010 film of the same name and their last developed game release of DreamWorks Animation's Megamind film.

In August 2011, THQ Studio Australia was announced to be closed down as part of a restructuring and realignment plan by parent company, THQ.

Games developed

References

External links
 Queensland Games

Australian companies established in 2003
Australian companies disestablished in 2011
THQ
Video game companies established in 2003
Video game companies disestablished in 2011
Defunct video game companies of Australia
Australian subsidiaries of foreign companies